Wayne Che Yip (born 1981) is a British television director, most notably connected with Utopia, Doctor Who and Amazon Prime's The Lord of the Rings: The Rings of Power.

Early life and education 
Wayne was born in Oxford in 1981 and was educated at Dragon School, Abingdon School, D'Overbroeck's College and later studied at Banbury College where he graduated in 2004 with a degree in graphic design.

Career

Work with Alex Garcia Lopez 
He developed an interest in filmmaking after working in the Phoenix Picturehouse in Jericho and came to prominence when he co-wrote and directed Happy Birthday Grandad with Alex Garcia Lopez, which won the 2007 Sixty Seconds of Fame BAFTA.

The pair then created the short films Samantha (2008), Be Lucky (2008) and Diego's Story (2009), as well as the episode "Would Like To Meet" (2010) of the Channel 4 anthology series Coming Up.

Following on from this, they went on to direct the first half of the fourth series of Secret Diary of a Call Girl (2011), starring Billie Piper, three episodes of the third series of Misfits and the second half of the first series of Dennis Kelly's Utopia (2013).

Later work 
In 2013, he came back to Misfits to direct the final episode of the show, this time without Garcia Lopez. In 2015, he directed four episodes of Tatau. He then directed two episodes of the series Class, "Detained" and "The Metaphysical Engine, or What Quill Did". This was followed by the Doctor Who series 10 episodes "The Lie of the Land" and "Empress of Mars", and the 2019 New Year's Day special episode "Resolution".

In March 2021, Amazon Prime Video announced that Yip would take over directing duties for four episodes of The Lord of the Rings: The Rings of Power series, as well as serving as co-executive producer.

He has also directed on many major series in the United States including Salem, Preacher, Into the Badlands, Happy!, Dirk Gently's Holistic Detective Agency, Doom Patrol andHunters, starring Al Pacino.

Filmography

Television

Short films

References

External links

Living people
1981 births
English people of Chinese descent
English television directors
People associated with Oxford Brookes University
People educated at Abingdon School
People educated at The Dragon School
People from Oxford